Edgewood is a town in Anderson Township, Madison County, Indiana, United States. It is part of the Anderson, Indiana Metropolitan Statistical Area. The population was 1,913 at the 2010 census.

History
Edgewood was founded in 1916 as a suburb for automotive workers.

Geography
Edgewood is located at  (40.102341, -85.735440).

Demographics

2010 census
As of the census of 2010, there were 1,913 people, 854 households, and 566 families living in the town. The racial makeup of the town was 92.9% White, 4.5% African American, 0.2% Native American, 0.3% Asian, 0.9% from other races, and 1.2% from two or more races. Hispanic or Latino of any race were 1.8% of the population.

There were 854 households, of which 24.5% had children under the age of 18 living with them; 55.4% were married couples living together; 8.2% had a female householder with no husband present; 2.7% had a male householder with no wife present; and 33.7% were non-families. 29.0% of all households were made up of individuals, and 13.4% had someone living alone who was 65 years of age or older. The average household size was 2.24 and the average family size was 2.75.

The median age in the town was 47.4 years. 20.2% of residents were under the age of 18; 4.4% were between the ages of 18 and 24; 22.2% were from 25 to 44; 31.8% were from 45 to 64; and 21.3% were 65 years of age or older. The gender makeup of the town was 47.0% male and 53.0% female.

2000 census
As of the census of 2000, there were 1,988 people, 875 households, and 620 families living in the town. The racial makeup of the town was 95.57% White, 3.37% African American, 0.05% Native American, 0.15% Asian, 0.20% from other races, and 0.65% from two or more races. Hispanic or Latino of any race were 0.25% of the population.

There were 875 households, out of which 24.7% had children under the age of 18 living with them;63.1% were married couples living together; 5.6% had a female householder with no husband present;CEand 29.1% were non-families. 26.7% of all households were made up of individuals, and 15.1% had someone living alone who was 65 years of age or older. The average household size was 2.27 and the average family size was 2.73.

In the town, the population was spread out, with 20.3% under the age of 18, 3.8% from 18 to 24, 25.1% from 25 to 44, 28.1% from 45 to 64, and 22.8% who were 65 years of age or older. The median age was 46 years. For every 100 females, there were 91.3 males. For every 100 females age 18 and over, there were 86.9 males.

The median income for a household in the town was $57,857, and the median income for a family was $74,508. Males had a median income of $49,808 versus $31,739 for females. The per capita income for the town was $30,383. About 0.8% of families and 1.9% of the population were below the poverty line, including 2.1% of those under age 18 and 2.8% of those age 65 or over.

References

External links
 Town of Edgewood website

Towns in Madison County, Indiana
Towns in Indiana